Hofbräuhaus Columbus is a German brewery and restaurant in Grandview Heights, a suburban enclave of Columbus, Ohio.

Description and history

The 18,000 square foot beer hall is modeled after the Staatliches Hofbräuhaus in München, and has a patio. Hofbräuhaus Columbus opened in late October 2014.

In 2019, Columbus Monthly Jackie Mantey wrote:

See also
 List of German restaurants

References

External links

 
 Hofbräuhaus Columbus at BeerAdvocate
 Business Spotlight: Hofbräuhaus Columbus at the German Village Society
 Hofbräuhaus Columbus at Ohio Craft Brewers Association
 Hofbräuhaus Columbus at Ohio.org (Ohio Department of Development)
 Hofbrauhaus Columbus at Zomato

2014 establishments in Ohio
Beer in Ohio
Franklin County, Ohio
German restaurants in the United States
German-American culture in Ohio
Restaurants established in 2014
Restaurants in Columbus, Ohio